The Ostrovul Mare Bridge is a bridge in Romania over the  of the Danube. It is intended for complementary access to the Ostrovu Mare Island and the Iron Gate II Hydroelectric Power Station, respectively to the local border crossing point between Romania and Serbia.

See also
List of bridges in Romania

External links
 Description

Bridges in Romania
Bridges over the Danube
Buildings and structures in Mehedinți County
Suspension bridges
International bridges
Romania–Serbia border crossings